Ravindra Kisan Gaikwad is an Indian civil servant and officer in the Government of Maharashtra cadre. He is senior member of Road Safety Cell of Government of Maharashtra formed by Supreme Court of India and chief of RTO, Thane and the Konkan region. He serves as the chairman of the Handball Federation of India, a member of International Handball Federation. He is also on the board of Indian Olympic Association and All India Football Federation and the Chairman of Shant Bharat Surakshit Bharat. He has been reelected as President of Handball Association of Maharashtra for second consecutive term in June 2022.

Early life and education
Ravi Gaikwad was born in Pune to Pushpa and Kisanrao Gaikwad. He completed his early education at Little Flower Convent High School and received his Engineering Degree in Electronics and Telecommunications.

Gaikwad was a state topper in the merit list of Higher Secondary Certificate Examinations (HSC) in Maharashtra State. He has represented in Under 15, Under 17, and Under 19 categories of Maharashtra  and was selected in the Ranji Trophy Camp of Maharashtra. After engineering he joined TATA as a scientist. Gaikwad cleared Civil Services and joined the Government of Maharashtra. He received two Gold Medals one for being first in Electronics and Telecommunications Engineering and also being first in all the branches of Engineering across all Universities in the state of Maharashtra. Ravi has completed his PhD (Doctorate in Philosophy) in (Electronics and Telecommunications Engineering) and PhD (Doctorate in Philosophy) in Sports.

Road Safety World Series

Ravi Gaikwad is the founder of Road Safety World Series who promotes Road Safety  to save Indian lives on Indian Roads. Government of India plays an important role in Road Safety World Series. Hon. Minister Nitin Gadkari has been supporting this series for such a noble cause of road safety.

It is a legends Cricket World Cup, an annual event. Every year almost three lakh people die on Indian Roads in road accidents and a million people are handicapped every year. Sachin Tendulkar is the Brand Ambassador of the series and Mr Sunil Gavaskar is the commissioner of the series. Season 1 commenced at Wankhede stadium in March 2020 and was split in two phases due to covid concluding in March 2021 at Raipur.

Ravi Gaikwad is also playing in the India Legends team as a player under the captaincy of Sachin Tendulkar in Road safety world series to promote Road safety. Ravi Gaikwad, the founder of the series got together with Yohan Blake, Olympic Gold Medallist to promote the noble cause of road safety in this series.

Public safety

Gaikwad worked as the head regional transport officer of the Andheri RTO. In 2009, he was accused in controversies related to registration of imported bikes. (Ultimately he was exonerated of all charges). Subsequently, he was transferred to Beed but he did not join the office there. In 2015, Gaikwad was appointed as the deputy regional transport officer. He also held the office of Borivali Regional Transport Office, Mumbai as the Chief. Currently he is the head of RTO Thane and Konkan.

In 2018, Gaikwad organized the 'Horn Not Ok' campaign to increase road safety awareness. The drive was attended by Indian cricketers Hardik Pandya and Shikhar Dhawan.

During the coronavirus lockdown, in May 2020, Gaikwad saw action against illegal transport of migrants with them issuing 250 memos to such vehicles.

Shant Bharat Surakshit Bharat
Ravi Gaikwad is the chairman of "Shant Bharat Surakshit Bharat" a philanthropic trust.

US Hall of Fame
Ravi Gaikwad has been inducted in US Hall of fame.
The others inducted in Hall of fame  Since its inception are several former cricket stars including Sir Donald George Bradman, Sir Everton Weekes, Sir Frank Worrell, Sir Garfield Sobers, Sir Leonard Hutton, Sir Vivian Richards, Abid Sayed Ali, Alvin Kallicharran, Sunil Gavaskar, Gundappa Viswanath.

Awards

 Guinness World Record for the largest handball class conducted to encourage the playing of handball in India.
 Road Safety Award from Government of Maharashtra for spreading awareness and in turn reducing the number of deaths and road accidents in the state.
Guinness book of world record for Road Safety in 2016
 CSR Times Award 2020 for promoting road safety, sports, and social welfare.
In May 2021, Gaikwad has been honoured with INDIA CORONA AWARD by Wockhardt Foundation. In the same year he has also been honoured with COVID FIGHTERS AWARD by Government of Maharashtra.
Mother Teresa International Award 2022 for Social Justice by Governor of Maharashtra.
Maharashtra Gaurav Puraskar for promotion of Road Safety.
Zee Lifetime Achievement Award in Engineering, Science and Technology
Times Lifetime Achievement Award,Times Brand Icon by Times Group in Sports
CNBC Lifetime Achievement Award in Sports

Personal life
Gaikwad is married with Dr Nirmala who is a practicing physician and they have two children.

References

External links

See also
Road safety world series
Road Safety World Series squads
Uttarakhand State Football Association

Living people
People from Pune
Year of birth missing (living people)
Indian philanthropists
Indian civil servants
People from Maharashtra